Allahabad Clock Tower is a clock tower located in Allahabad, Uttar Pradesh, India also known as Chowk Ghantaghar.
it was built in 1913 and it is a landmark of Old Allahabad.

History
It is located in the centre of the Chowk, Allahabad, which is one of oldest markets in India and is an example of the artistic and structural skills of Mughals. Built in the year 1913, it is one of the oldest clock tower in India

See also
List of clock towers

References

External links
Article in outlook India magazine

Clock towers in India
Buildings and structures in Allahabad
Tourist attractions in Allahabad